Strážné is a village and municipality in the Vrchlabí District in the Hradec Kralové Region of north-eastern Bohemia.

Strážné is a small community; nearby towns are Friesovy Boudy (Friesbauden), Herlíkovice (Hackelsdorf), Hříběcí Boudy (Füllebauden), Husí Boudy (Gansbauden), Jezerní Domky (Teichhäuser), Krásná Pláň (Schöne Lahn), Lahrovy Boudy (Lahrbauden), Mlýnské Domky (Mühlberg) Well Výhlédach (Höhenschmiede), Přední Rennerovky (Vorder Rennerbauden), Seidlovy Domky (Seidelhäuser), Šestidomí (Sächsstädten) and Zadní Rennerovky (Hinter Rennerbauden).

History
The first written mention of Pommerdörfl dates from the year 1754. The town has had mining operations since the mid-17th century, as there has been a mining settlement and a Pochwork to Keilbach above the old Silesian Trail. The name of the village derives not, as a legend claims from local founders, but from the mining activity.

Geography
The village lies at an altitude of 798 metres and covers an area of 17.66 km².
It has a population of about 166 people. There is a  Strážne (Slovakia) in Slovakia, which was known as Őrös from its founding until after 1920 when that part of Hungary was turned over to Slovakia. Between 1938–45 it again became part of Hungary reuniting the 100% Hungarian population with their homeland.  It has a population of 661 people as of the last Slovak census out of which 95% of the population claimed to be Hungarian. It is located just north of the Hungarian-Slovakian border, in fact it borders on Hungary and covers an area of 1746 hectares. [www.strazne.sk]

External links
http://www.oustrazne.cz/

Populated places in the Hradec Králové Region